The Battle of Lundby happened south of Lundby in northeast Himmerland on the 3 July 1864 in the Second War of Schleswig. A Danish company of the First Regiment tried a head-on bayonet charge down a long hillside, but was stopped 20 meters in front of the earth dike that the Prussians lay in cover behind. It was the last battle in the Second Schleswig War, and resulted in great Danish losses.

Background
At the time the fight in Jutland had really been given up. The army had been severely defeated at Dybbøl in April and a few days after displaced from Als. The remaining forces had withdrawn north of Limfjorden and were being evacuated from Frederikshavn.

The First Regiment under Lieutenant-Colonel H.C.J. Beck had been left behind in Nørresundby to hide the retreat as long as possible, secure the sea-inlet crossings and - if possible without disproportionate risk - advance southwards.

On 1 July the Prussians sent three scouting units north from Hobro. Beck decided immediately to move to the south with Fifth Company (160 men) against Ellidshøj. Here he expected to meet one of the commands in night's lodging. This had moved south, but another was reported from Gunderup to the east, which Beck reached at dawn. Here a column of dragoons was seen to the north, and by scouts it was found that it stopped in Lundby.

The battle

The scouts had been seen by the Prussians who had gone in cover with about 70 out of 124 men behind an earth dike in Lundby's south edge. From the burial mound Kongehøj about 500 metres south of the town, a long flat hill slopes down to the town. Beck ordered the company commander, Captain P.C. Hammerich, to carry out a strong determined bayonet charge from Kongehøj.

Several locals were here and offered to lead the company easterly through a ravine or westerly where some fences would be able to give cover, which Beck however refused, as his company was not to be led by a farmer, and as the straight road was the shortest.

With cheers the company ran forward in half columns. The Prussians with their breech-loading rifles fired 3 salvos (the first at 200 meters' distance), stopping the attack 20 meters in front of the earth dike. The Danish lost 98 men, three-quarters of their force, against three wounded Prussians.

The Prussians did not choose to exploit the victory to chase the remaining Danes; instead they withdrew and went to Hobro bringing both their own and Danish wounded. They also brought 13 dead to Gunderup.

Result and analysis
The fighting's immediate result was a clear defeat for Denmark, as the Danish side had a loss of 32 dead, 44 wounded, 20 captured, and two missing - in all 98 - against only three wounded Prussians.

In the big picture the fight would not mean much - Denmark had already lost the war, and a possible victory would hardly have altered this. Generally it is said that an attacker at the start should have a strength superiority on a factor of three; here were the Danes not even twice as many as the defending Prussians. But yet different causes come from analysing supplementary causes of the Danish defeat.

Muzzle loaders and breech loaders
The Prussians had more modern breech loading rifles that could shoot faster than the Danish muzzle loading rifles. Thus the Prussians had a bigger firepower, than the number of soldiers points out, and the relative strength is shifted to their advantage. Especially old sources point to this difference that incidentally is repeated everywhere in the Second War of Schleswig.

Bad leadership

There is a considerable criticism of Beck's leadership during the battle:
He chose to check out the Prussian companies without having a true reason for it,
He ought to have stayed with his main force about Nørresundby,
The attack was completed head-on over open field, where the forces for a long time would be exposed to the opponent's fire, instead of using local information about safer routes.
All of these points may be partly correct in themselves, but they leave unanswered the question of why Beck acted like he did. A possible explanation is that he needed to repair his reputation: He was a politician and had during the First War of Schleswig 15 years earlier been passed over for promotion for criticism by Colonel Læssøe, and would probably suffer the same again, for in February during the Battle of Sankelmark he left his unit while it was in battle.

Bayonet charges
Some sources also indicate that bayonet charges already were known to be hopeless, and that Beck ought to have known this. The regulations still included a procedure for bayonet charges, however, and this makes the criticism unreasonable. At the same time it can contribute to explain the outcome - to the extent that it is correct that bayonet charges already ought to have been disused.

Verdict at the time
Observers at the time did not consider the battle's outcome as a defeat, as it is widely considered today. Here had been wise initiative and energy, which just is, which is expected in war. Julius Strandberg wrote a broadside, in which the good commander was praised in a way, so it is difficult to see through that Denmark actually lost. Beck was subsequently appointed as Colonel and Commander of the Order of the Dannebrog.

Contemporary memories
 At the battlefield, immediately east of the highway, is a great cross in memory of the battle. Officers from Gardehusarregimentet (which continues the First Regiment's history) visit it at the anniversary of the battle.
 At the cemetery near Gunderup church there is a monument for the fallen.
 In Aalborg there is at Aalborg Forsvars and Garnisonsmuseum a relief model that shows the battle with the Danes on the way downhill.
 In Hobro there is a memorial to a Swedish officer, who voluntarily participated on the Danish side and died of wounds from the fight.

Notes
 First Regiment's history was continued by the Danske Livregiment, now Gardehusarregimentet.
 Half-columns means that the divisions advance with 16 soldiers behind each other. The regulations dictated that there had to not be more than six men in the depth.
 There has probably not been talk of firing in true salvos, but the Prussians' routine in reloading and shooting was the reason why it sounded like salvos.
 The count is here reproduced from Stevns; Furring points out the number to 97, of which 21 died  at once and 13 later.
 Bayonet charge was used entirely until World War I; Rommel describes among other things how he twice used them without luck.

Sources
 Bjørke, Sven m.fl.: Krigen 1864 : Den anden slesvigske krig i politisk og krigshistorisk belysning, København 1968.
 Nielsen, Søren: 1. Infanteri=Regiment i Vendsyssel : Kampene ved LUNDBY og HEDEGAARDE d. 3/7 1864, København, 1967.
 Schiøtt, F.C.: Affairen ved Lundby, København 1877.
 Stevns, Arne: Vor Hær I Krig og Fred, Nordiske Landes Bogforlag, 1943, bind II side 322-323.
 Sørensen, Carl Harding m.fl.: "Lundbyaffæren", Tidsskriftet Skalk 1997 nr. 3, side 20-26.
 Thygesen, Peter: Træfningen ved Lundby 3. juli 1864, Næstved 2002.

Battles involving Denmark
Battles involving Prussia
Conflicts in 1864
Battles of the Second Schleswig War
1864 in Denmark